Victor de Pol (1865 - 1925) was an Italian sculptor and medallist most active in Buenos Aires, Argentina.

Born in Venice, de Pol was a student of Giulio Monteverde.  (Monteverde was also the mentor to Argentine sculptor Lola Mora.)  He immigrated to Argentina at the age of 22 and participated in the development of La Plata, designing Beaux-Arts-style sculpture for major public buildings. At least judging from his commissions related to President Domingo Faustino Sarmiento, de Pol was socially well-connected.

From 1890 through 1895 de Pol returned to Europe.  His return to Argentina brought the major work of his career, the 8-meter, 20-ton heroic quadriga on the Argentine National Congress building,  1906.

He is buried in La Recoleta Cemetery in the family vault of Aristóbulo del Valle, the great uncle of de Pol's wife Asimilda del Valle.

Work 

 bust of President Sarmiento, at the Sarmiento Museum, circa 1887
 sculpture of a condor atop a pylon at the tomb of Sarmiento, designed by Sarmiento himself, at La Recoleta Cemetery, 1888
 twelve facade busts of scientists, and the two sabertoothed Smilodon flanking the entrance to the La Plata Museum, 1888
 quadriga at the Argentine National Congress, circa 1906
 tomb of Archbishop Federico León Aneiros, Archbishop of Buenos Aires, inside the Buenos Aires Metropolitan Cathedral

Sources 

 online biography

1865 births
1925 deaths
Argentine sculptors
Argentine male artists
Male sculptors
Burials at La Recoleta Cemetery
Sculptors from Venice
Italian emigrants to Argentina
20th-century sculptors
19th-century sculptors